Miguel's War is a 2021 internationally co-produced documentary film, directed by Eliane Raheb and released in 2021. The film is a portrait of Michel Jleilaty, a gay man from Lebanon who has been living in Spain as an adult under the assumed name Miguel Alonso, as he revisits the childhood traumas that made him want to escape his homeland.

The film premiered in the Panorama program at the 71st Berlin International Film Festival, where it won the Teddy Award for best LGBTQ-themed feature film, and took second place for the Panorama Audience Award.

References

External links
 

2021 films
2021 documentary films
2021 LGBT-related films
German documentary films
German LGBT-related films
Lebanese documentary films
Lebanese LGBT-related films
Spanish documentary films
Spanish LGBT-related films
Documentary films about gay men
2020s Arabic-language films
2020s Spanish-language films
2021 multilingual films
German multilingual films
Lebanese multilingual films
Spanish multilingual films